In Sufism, a murid is an initiate under a spiritual guide. The word has come to designate several specific historical episodes: 
 the Murīdūn, a rebellious Sufi order in 12th-century Al-Andalus (now Spain)
 the Murid War, or 19th-century Russian conquest of Chechnya and Dagestan
 the Mouride brotherhood, a prominent Sufi order in contemporary West Africa

Murid may also refer to:
 A member of the mouse family Muridae
 Murid (Chakwal), town in Punjab, Pakistan
 PAF Base Murid, air base in Murid
 Mirik, Iran, also known as Murid